The 1890 Colorado gubernatorial election was held on November 4, 1890. Republican nominee John Long Routt defeated Democratic nominee Caldwell Yeaman with 50.11% of the vote.

General election

Candidates
Major party candidates
John Long Routt, Republican
Caldwell Yeaman, Democratic

Other candidates
John G. Coy, Union Labor
John A. Elett, Prohibition

Results

References

1890
Colorado
Gubernatorial